It Happened in Seville (Spanish: Sucedió en Sevilla) is a 1955 Spanish musical film directed by José Gutiérrez Maesso and starring Juanita Reina, Rubén Rojo and Alfredo Mayo. It is a remake of the 1942 film The White Dove in which Reina had also starred. It was remade again in 1966 as Road to Rocío  with Carmen Sevilla as the lead.

The film's sets were designed by Enrique Alarcón.

Cast
 Juanita Reina as Esperanza  
 Rubén Rojo as Juan Antonio  
 Alfredo Mayo as Alberto Campos  
 Maria Piazzai as María Jesús 
 Julia Caba Alba as Sirvienta  
 José Calvo as Mayoral Manuel  
 Concha Colado 
 María Fernanda D'Ocón
 José Marco Davó as Fernando Aguilar  
 Manuel Fuentes
 Cándida Losada as Cristina  
 María Vicenta Martín 
 Juanjo Menéndez as Morton  
 Mario Moreno as Ricardo Parra 'Ceci'  
 Elisa Méndez as Doña Martina  
 Amelia Ortas 
 Luis Pavón
 Manuel Portela 
 Prudencio Rivas 
 Luisa Sala 
 Carmen Sanz 
 Josefina Serratosa 
 Laura Valenzuela as Alberto's flirt

References

Bibliography 
 Juan Francisco Cerón Gómez. El cine de Juan Antonio Bardem. EDITUM, 1998.

External links 
 

1955 musical films
Spanish musical films
1955 films
1950s Spanish-language films
Films based on works by Alejandro Pérez Lugín
Films directed by José Gutiérrez Maesso
Films set in Seville
Remakes of Spanish films
Cifesa films
Spanish black-and-white films
1950s Spanish films